Bert de Jong may refer to:
 Bert de Jong (speed skater) (born 1955), Dutch speed skater
 Bert de Jong (rally driver) (1956–2013), Dutch rally champion
 Bert de Jong (politician) (born 1945), member of the Dutch Senate

See also
 De Jong